The Apertura 2016 Copa MX (officially the Apertura 2016 Copa Corona MX for sponsorship reasons) was the 76th staging of the Copa MX, the 49th staging in the professional era and is the ninth tournament played since the 1996–97 edition.

This tournament began on 19 July 2016 and ended on 2 November 2016. As winners, Querétaro will face the winner of the Clausura 2017 edition in the 2017 Supercopa MX.

Querétaro won their first title after defeating Guadalajara 3–2 on penalty kicks in the final.

Format changes 
A different format was used starting with this edition of the tournament.

In previous editions of the tournament there was no draw. Starting with this edition, a draw was held to determine the groups. 
Only the top 12 teams in the 2015–16 Liga MX season Aggregate table (the sum of points of both the Apertura and Clausura tournaments) not qualified to the 2016–17 CONCACAF Champions League will participate in the tournament. 
24 teams were drawn into eight groups of three instead of seven (Apertura) or six (Clausura) groups of four. 
Each group will consist of at least one team from each league, no group can have three teams from the same league. 
The two best teams of each group will advance to the Knockout stage instead of just the group winners and the best second place team. 
There is no more extra point for winning a round since there are no more rounds.
This is the first time the tournament has a Round of 16.

Participants
This tournament will feature clubs from Liga MX who will not participate in the 2016–17 CONCACAF Champions League (UANL, UNAM, Pachuca and Monterrey). Atlas will not participate in the tournament after being the worst non-relegated team in the 2015–16 Liga MX season Aggregate table. Necaxa will not participate in the tournament due to being recently promoted to Liga MX.

The tournament will also feature the top 12 Ascenso MX teams of the Clausura 2016 classification table, excluding Correcaminos UAT who were replaced by Dorados de Sinaloa in the tournament.

Draw
The draw for the tournament took place on June 7, 2016 at the Iberostar Cancún in Cancún, Quintana Roo, Mexico. 24 teams were drawn into eight groups of three, with each group containing one team from each of the three pots.

Clubs in Pot 1 were drawn to be the seed of each group according to the order of their drawing. That is, the first club that was drawn is seed of Group 1, the second drawn is seed of Group 2 and so on and so on. The Liga MX teams in Pot 1 are the best four teams in the Aggregate table who are not participating in the 2016–17 CONCACAF Champions League. The Ascenso MX teams in Pot 1 are the three best teams in the Clausura 2016 classification table along with the team relegated from Liga MX (Dorados de Sinaloa).

Pot 2 contained Liga MX and Ascenso MX clubs who ended 5–8 in the Aggregate table and Clausura 2016 classification table respectively.

Pot 3 contained Liga MX and Ascenso MX clubs who ended 9–12 in the Aggregate table and Clausura 2016 classification table respectively.

Tiebreakers
If two or more clubs are equal on points on completion of the group matches, the following criteria are applied to determine the rankings:

 superior goal difference;
 higher number of goals scored;
 scores of the group matches played among the clubs in question;
 higher number of goals scored away in the group matches played among the clubs in question;
 best position in the Relegation table;
 fair play ranking;
 drawing of lots.

Group stage
Every group is composed of three clubs, each group has at least one club from Liga MX and Ascenso MX.

All times are UTC−06:00 except for matches in Ciudad Juárez, Sinaloa, Tepic (all UTC−07:00) and Tijuana (UTC−08:00)

Group 1

Group 2

Group 3

Group 4

Group 5

Group 6

Group 7

Group 8

Knockout stage
The clubs that advance to this stage will be ranked and seeded 1 to 16 based on performance in the group stage. In case of ties, the same tiebreakers used to rank the runners-up will be used.
All rounds are played in a single game. If a game ends in a draw, it will proceed directly to a penalty shoot-out. The highest seeded club will host each match, regardless of which division each club belongs. 
The two best teams of each group will advance to the Knockout stage. 
This is the first time the tournament has a Round of 16.
All match times are UTC−06:00 except for matches in Ciudad Juárez (UTC−07:00)

Qualified teams
The winners and runners-up of each of the eight groups in the group stage qualify for the final stages.

Seeding

Bracket

Round of 16

Quarterfinals

Semifinals

Final

Top goalscorers
Players sorted first by goals scored, then by last name. 

Source: LaCopaMX.net

References

External links
Official site

2016, 2
Copa Mx, 2
Copa Mx, 2